Un homme libre (French for A free man) may refer to:

Film and television
Un homme libre (1921 film), French title of American western film The Big Punch directed by John Ford
Un homme libre (1973 film), with Gilbert Bécaud and Olga Georges-Picot directed by Roberto Muller
Un homme libre, Andreï Sakharov, a 2009 documentary film by Iosif Pasternak about Andrei Sakharov

Literature
Un homme libre, novel by Maurice Barrès 1889
Un homme libre, book by Philippe Bouvard 1995

Music
Un homme libre (album) Baptiste Giabiconi 2014
"Un homme libre", single by David Hallyday 2002
"Un homme libre", single by Marie Myriam R. Carlos, E. Carlos, C. Level	1979
"Un homme libre", single, theme song from the 1973 film Un homme libre, sung by Gilles Marchal composed by Francis Lai with lyrics by Catherine Desage, Pathé 1973